The  is a river in Shizuoka Prefecture of central Japan.

The river rises from Akaishi Mountains which stretch over the border between Yamanashi and Shizuoka Prefectures, and flows into Suruga Bay in the Pacific Ocean). It is known for its clear stream and forms part of the main water supply for Shizuoka city.

There are many hot springs at the river head, which is also known for its numerous landslides and for the Abe Great Falls, one of Japan's Top 100 Waterfalls. Unlike the nearby Tenryū River and Ōi River, there are no dams on the Abe River.

Shōgun Tokugawa Ieyasu carried out extensive construction and formed the present route of the lower course of the river. , a mochi rice cake dusted with kinako (soybean flour) has been a local speciality of this area since at least the Edo period.

References

 (mouth)

Rivers of Shizuoka Prefecture
Rivers of Japan